, also spelt as Ōyanojima  It is administered as part of the city of Kami-Amakusa. It is connected to the Japanese mainland since 1966 by Five Bridges of Amakusa. The Japan National Route 266 passes through the island. The island primary industry is aquaculture of fish and shrimps. Large part of island belongs to Unzen-Amakusa National Park.

Geography
Ōyano-jima is an irregular shape, with a ragged, elongated outline oriented at north-south axis. It is a northernmost island in the archipelago and serves as a gateway to entire Amakusa.

Climate
Ōyano-jima has a humid subtropical climate (Köppen climate classification Cfa) with very warm summers and mild winters. Precipitation is significant throughout the year; The summer tends to be Ōyano-jima's wettest season, with the tsuyu (梅雨 tsuyu, "plum rain") — the rainy season — occurring between early June (average:Jun.7) to late July (average:Jul.21).

Notable people
Amakusa Shirō (leader of Shimabara rebellion)

External links
Photo gallery of Ōyano-jima at tripadvisor.ie

References

This article incorporates material from Japanese Wikipedia page 大矢野島, accessed 20 September 2018

Islands of Kumamoto Prefecture